Andrew Loh (born 9 October 1949) is a Hong Kong former butterfly, freestyle and medley swimmer. He competed in five events at the 1968 Summer Olympics.

References

External links
 

1949 births
Living people
Hong Kong male butterfly swimmers
Hong Kong male freestyle swimmers
Hong Kong male medley swimmers
Olympic swimmers of Hong Kong
Swimmers at the 1968 Summer Olympics
Swimmers from Shanghai
Swimmers at the 1966 Asian Games
Asian Games competitors for Hong Kong